Maximilian Adelbert Baer (February 11, 1909 – November 21, 1959) was an American professional boxer and the world heavyweight champion from June 14, 1934, to June 13, 1935. Two of his fights (a 1933 win over Max Schmeling and a 1935 loss to James J. Braddock) were rated Fight of the Year by The Ring magazine. Baer was also a boxing referee, and had occasional roles on film or television. He was the brother of heavyweight boxing contender Buddy Baer and father of actor Max Baer Jr. Baer is rated #22 on The Ring magazine's list of 100 greatest punchers of all time.

Early life
Baer was born on February 11, 1909, in Omaha, Nebraska, to Jacob Baer (1875–1938) and Dora Bales (1877–1938). His father was the son of Aschill Baer and Fannie Fischel, who were Jewish emigrants from Alsace-Lorraine and Bohemia, respectively; his mother was of Scots-Irish descent. His elder sister was Frances May Baer (1905–1991), his younger sister was Bernice Jeanette Baer (1911–1987), his younger brother was boxer-turned-actor Jacob Henry Baer, better known as Buddy Baer (1915–1986), and his adopted brother was August "Augie" Baer. For a period Jacob Baer worked as the manager of the meat packing concern of the Graden Mercantile Co. in Durango, Colorado.

Move to California
In May 1922, tired of the winters that aggravated Frances's rheumatic fever and Jacob's high blood pressure, the Baers drove to the milder climes of the West Coast, where Dora's sister lived in Alameda, California. Jacob's expertise in the butcher business led to numerous job offers around the San Francisco Bay Area. While living in Hayward, Max took his first job as a delivery boy for John Lee Wilbur. Wilbur ran a grocery store and bought meat from Jacob.

The Baers lived in the Northern Californian towns of Hayward, San Leandro and Galt before moving to Livermore in 1926. Livermore was cowboy country, surrounded by tens of thousands of acres of rangeland which supported large cattle herds that provided fresh meat to the local area. In 1928, Jacob leased the Twin Oaks Ranch in Murray Township, where he raised more than 2,000 hogs and worked with daughter Frances's husband, Louis Santucci. Baer often credited working as a butcher boy, carrying heavy carcasses of meat, stunning cattle with one blow, and working at a gravel pit, for developing his powerful shoulders (an article in the January 1939 edition of The Family Circle Magazine reported that Baer also took the Charles Atlas exercise course.)

Professional boxing career
Baer turned professional in 1929, progressing steadily through the Pacific Coast ranks. A ring tragedy little more than a year later almost caused Baer to drop out of boxing for good.

Frankie Campbell
Baer fought Frankie Campbell on August 25, 1930, in San Francisco in a ring built over home plate at San Francisco's Recreation Park for the unofficial title of Pacific Coast champion. In the second round, Campbell clipped Baer and Baer slipped to the canvas. Campbell went toward his corner and waved to the crowd. He thought Baer was getting the count. Baer got up and flew at Campbell, landing a right to Campbell's turned head which sent him to the canvas.

After the round, Campbell said to his trainer, "Something feels like it snapped in my head" but went on to handily win rounds 3 and 4. As Baer rose for the 5th round, Tillie "Kid" Herman, Baer's former friend and trainer, who had switched camps overnight and was now in Campbell's corner, savagely taunted and jeered Baer. In a rage and determined to end the bout with a knockout, Baer soon had Campbell against the ropes. As he hammered him with punch after punch, the ropes were the only thing holding Campbell up. By the time referee Toby Irwin stopped the fight, Campbell collapsed to the canvas. Baer's own seconds reportedly ministered to Campbell, and Baer stayed by his side until an ambulance arrived 30 minutes later. Baer "visited the stricken fighter's bedside", where he offered Frankie's wife Ellie the hand that hit her husband. She took that hand and the two stood speechless for a moment. "It was unfortunate, I'm awfully sorry", said Baer. "It even might have been you, mightn't it?" she replied.

At noon the next day, with a lit candle laced between his crossed fingers, and his wife and mother beside him, Frankie Campbell was pronounced dead. Upon the surgeon's announcement of Campbell's death, Baer broke down and sobbed inconsolably. Brain specialist Dr. Tilton E. Tillman "declared death had been caused by a succession of blows on the jaw and not by any struck on the rear of the head" and that Campbell's brain had been "knocked completely loose from his skull" by Baer's blows.

Ernie Schaaf
The Campbell incident earned Baer the reputation as a "killer" in the ring. This publicity was further sensationalized by Baer's return bout with Ernie Schaaf, on August 31, 1932. Schaaf had bested Baer in a decision during Max's Eastern debut bout at Madison Square Garden on September 19, 1930.

An Associated Press article in the September 9, 1932, sports section of the New York Times describes the end of the return bout as follows:Two seconds before the fight ended Schaaf was knocked flat on his face, completely knocked out. He was dragged to his corner and his seconds worked on him for three minutes before restoring him to his senses... Baer smashed a heavy right to the jaw that shook Schaaf to his heels, to start the last round, then walked into the Boston fighter, throwing both hands to the head and body. Baer drove three hard rights to the jaw that staggered Schaaf. Baer beat Schaaf around the ring and into the ropes with a savage attack to the head and body. Just before the round ended Baer dropped Schaaf to the canvas, but the bell sounded as Schaaf hit the floor. Schaaf complained frequently of headaches after that bout. Five months after the Baer fight, on February 11, 1933, Schaaf died in the ring after taking a left jab from the Italian fighter Primo Carnera. The majority of sports editors noted, however, that an autopsy later revealed Schaaf had meningitis, a swelling of the brain, and was still recovering from a severe case of influenza when he touched gloves with Carnera. Schaaf's obituary stated that "just before his bout with Carnera, Schaaf went into reclusion in a religious retreat near Boston to recuperate from an attack of influenza" which produced the meningitis.

The death of Campbell and accusations over Schaaf's demise profoundly affected Baer, even though he was ostensibly indestructible and remained a devastating force in the ring. According to his son, actor/director Max Baer Jr. (who was born seven years after the incident):My father cried about what happened to Frankie Campbell. He had nightmares. In reality, my father was one of the kindest, gentlest men you would ever hope to meet. He treated boxing the way today's professional wrestlers do wrestling: part sport, mostly showmanship. He never deliberately hurt anyone.

In the case of Campbell, Baer was charged with manslaughter. Baer was eventually acquitted of all charges, but the California State Boxing Commission still banned him from any in-ring activity within the state for the next year. Baer gave purses from succeeding bouts to Campbell's family, but lost four of his next six fights. He fared better when Jack Dempsey took him under his wing.

Max Schmeling

On June 8, 1933, Baer fought and defeated German heavyweight and former world champion Max Schmeling at Yankee Stadium, by technical knockout.  Schmeling was favored to win, and was Adolf Hitler's favorite fighter. The Nazi tabloid Der Stürmer publicly attacked Schmeling for fighting a non-Aryan, as Baer's father was Jewish, calling it a "racial and cultural disgrace."

Although the Great Depression, then in full force, had lowered the income of most citizens, sixty thousand people attended the fight. NBC radio updated millions nationwide as the match progressed. Baer, who was of one half Jewish descent, wore trunks which displayed the Star of David, a symbol he wore in all his future bouts. When the fight began, he dominated the rugged Schmeling into the tenth round, when Baer knocked him down and the referee stopped the match. Columnist Westbrook Pegler wrote about Schmeling's loss, "That wasn't a defeat, that was a disaster", while journalist David Margolick claimed that Baer's win would come to "symbolize Jewry's struggle against the Nazis."

Baer became a hero among Jews, those who identified with Jews, and those who despised the Nazis. According to biographer David Bret, after the war ended, it was learned that Schmeling had in fact saved the lives of many Jewish children during the war while still serving his country.

American film star Greta Garbo considered Baer's defeat of Schmeling to be a "mini-victory" over Nazism, and she invited him to visit her while she was filming Queen Christina in Hollywood. However, Baer's being allowed on the set was considered a "sacrilege" in Hollywood, as even MGM studio's head, Louis B. Mayer, wasn't allowed on Garbo's set, since she demanded total privacy while acting. Their friendship led to a romance, which lasted until he returned to New York to train for his next fight, this one against Primo Carnera.

World Heavyweight Champion
On June 14, 1934, at the outdoor Madison Square Garden Bowl at Long Island City, New York, Baer defeated the huge reigning world champion Primo Carnera of Italy, who weighed in at 267 pounds.  Baer knocked down the champion 11 times before the fight was stopped in the eleventh round by referee Arthur Donovan to save Carnera from further punishment.  All the knockdowns occurred in rounds one, two, ten and eleven, in which Baer thoroughly dominated. The intervening rounds were competitive. There is some dispute about the number of knockdowns scored as Carnera slipped to the canvas on several occasions and was wrestled to the canvas other times. Despite this dominant performance over Carnera, Baer would hold the world heavyweight title for just 364 days.

James J. Braddock 
On June 13, 1935, one of the greatest upsets in boxing history transpired in Long Island City, New York, as Baer fought down-and-out boxer James J. Braddock in the so-called Cinderella Man bout. Baer hardly trained for the bout. Braddock, on the other hand, was training hard. "I'm training for a fight, not a boxing contest or a clownin' contest or a dance," he said. "Whether it goes one round or three rounds or ten rounds, it will be a fight and a fight all the way. When you've been through what I've had to face in the last two years, a Max Baer or a Bengal tiger looks like a house pet. He might come at me with a cannon and a blackjack and he would still be a picnic compared to what I've had to face." Baer, ever the showman, "brought gales of laughter from the crowd with his antics" the night he stepped between the ropes to meet Braddock. As Braddock "slipped the blue bathrobe from his pink back, he was the sentimental favorite of a Bowl crowd of 30,000, most of whom had bet their money 8-to-1 against him." 

Max "undoubtedly paid the penalty for underestimating his challenger beforehand and wasting too much time clowning." At the end of 15 rounds Braddock emerged the victor in a unanimous decision, outpointing Baer 8 rounds to 6 in the "most astounding upset since John L. Sullivan went down before the thrusts of Gentleman Jim Corbett back in the nineties." Braddock took heavy hits from Baer but kept coming at him until he wore Max down. 

The fight was featured in the 2005 film Cinderella Man. Baer was portrayed by Craig Bierko and Braddock was portrayed by Russell Crowe.

Decline and retirement
Baer and his brother Buddy both lost fights to Joe Louis. In the third round of Max's September 1935 match, Louis knocked Baer down twice, the first time he had ever been knocked to the canvas in his career. A sizzling left hook in the fourth round brought Max to his knee again, and the referee called the bout soon after. It was learned weeks later that Baer fought Louis with a broken right hand that never healed from his fight with James J. Braddock. Max was virtually helpless without his big right hand in the Louis fight. In the first televised heavyweight prizefight, Baer lost to Lou Nova on June 1, 1939, on WNBT-TV in New York.

White Heavyweight Champ
Baer was awarded a belt declaring him the "White Heavyweight Champion of the World" after he scored a first-round TKO over Pat Cominsky in a bout at Roosevelt Stadium in Jersey City, New Jersey, on September 26, 1940, but it was a publicity stunt. The fight was not promoted as being for the white heavyweight championship, and Cominsky would not have won the belt had he beaten Baer.

The belt was a publicity stunt dreamed up by boxing promoters who were trying to pressure promoter Mike Jacobs into giving the ex-world heavyweight champion a rematch with current champ Joe Louis. Jacobs did not give Baer another bout with Louis. Baer retired after his next fight, on April 4, 1941, when he lost to Lou Nova on a TKO in the eighth round of a scheduled 10-rounder at Madison Square Garden. Nova did get a shot at Joe Louis, losing to the champion by TKO in the sixth round of a scheduled fifteen-round bout held at the Polo Grounds in New York.

Career statistics
Baer boxed in 84 professional fights from 1929 to 1941. In all, his record was 71–13. Fifty-three of those wins were knockouts, making him a member of the exclusive group of boxers to have won 50 or more bouts by knockout. Baer defeated the likes of Ernie Schaaf, Walter Cobb, Kingfish Levinsky, Max Schmeling, Tony Galento, Ben Foord and Tommy Farr. He was Heavyweight Champion of the World from June 14, 1934, to June 13, 1935.

Baer was a 1968 inductee into The Ring magazine's Boxing Hall of Fame (disbanded in 1987) and was inducted to the International Boxing Hall of Fame in 1995. He was inducted to the International Jewish Sports Hall of Fame in 2009. The 1998 Holiday Issue of Ring ranked Baer #20 in "The 50 Greatest Heavyweights of All Time". In Ring Magazine's 100 Greatest Punchers (published in 2003), Baer is ranked number 22.

Acting

Baer's motion picture debut was in The Prizefighter and the Lady (1933) opposite Myrna Loy and Walter Huston. In this MGM movie he played Steven "Steve" Morgan, a bartender that the Professor, played by Huston, begins training for the ring. Steve wins a fight, then marries Belle Mercer, played by Loy. He starts seriously training, but it turns out he has a huge ego and an eye for women. Featured were Baer's upcoming opponent, Primo Carnera, as himself, whom Steve challenges for the championship, and Jack Dempsey, as himself, former heavyweight champion, acting as the referee.

On March 29, 1934, The Prizefighter and the Lady was officially banned in Germany at the behest of Joseph Goebbels, Adolf Hitler's Minister of Propaganda and Public Entertainment, even though it received favorable reviews in local newspapers as well as in Nazi publications. When contacted for comment at Lake Tahoe, Baer said, "They didn't ban the picture because I have Jewish blood. They banned it because I knocked out Max Schmeling."  Baer enlisted, as did his brother Buddy, in the United States Army when World War II began.

Baer acted in almost 20 movies, including Africa Screams (1949) with Abbott and Costello, and made several television guest appearances. A clown in and out of the ring, Baer also appeared in a vaudeville act and on his own TV variety show. Baer appeared in Humphrey Bogart's final movie, The Harder They Fall (1956), opposite Mike Lane as Toro Moreno, a Hollywood version of Primo Carnera, whom Baer defeated for his heavyweight title. Budd Schulberg, who wrote the book from which the movie was made, portrayed the Baer character, "Buddy Brannen", as bloodthirsty, and the unfounded characterization was reprised in the movie Cinderella Man.

In 1950, Baer teamed up with another titleholder, friend and Light Heavyweight champion (1929–34) and boxer-turned actor/comedian, Maxie Rosenbloom. Together, the two starred in four slapstick comedy shorts for Columbia Pictures (produced by the makers of the Three Stooges comedies) and one feature film, Skipalong Rosenbloom (written by Rosenbloom, uncredited). Baer would also take the stage at Rosenbloom's comedy club on Wilshire Blvd, Slapsy Maxie's, which was featured in the film Gangster Squad. Baer and Rosenbloom remained friends until Baer's death in 1959.

Baer additionally worked as a disc jockey for a Sacramento radio station, and for a while he was a wrestler. He served as public relations director for a Sacramento automobile dealership and referee for boxing and wrestling matches.

Family
Baer was married twice, first to actress Dorothy Dunbar (married July 8, 1931 – divorced October 3, 1933) and then to Mary Ellen Sullivan (1903–1978) (married June 29, 1935 – his death 1959), the mother of his 3 children: actor Max Baer Jr. (born 1937), best known for playing Jethro Bodine on The Beverly Hillbillies; James Manny Baer (1941–2009); and Maudie Marian Baer (born 1944).

At the time of his death on November 21, 1959, Baer was scheduled to appear in some TV commercials in Los Angeles before returning to his home in Sacramento.

Death

On Wednesday, November 18, 1959, Baer refereed a nationally televised 10-round boxing match in Phoenix. At the end of the match, to the applause of the crowd, Baer grasped the ropes and vaulted out of the ring and joined fight fans in a cocktail bar. The next day, he was scheduled to appear in several television commercials in Hollywood, California. On his way, he stopped in Garden Grove, California, to keep a promise he had made thirteen years earlier to the then five-year-old son of his ex-sparring partner, Curly Owens. Baer presented the now 18-year-old with a foreign sports car on his birthday, as he had said he would.

Baer checked into the Hollywood Roosevelt Hotel upon his arrival on November 19. Hotel employees said he looked fit but complained of a cold. As he was shaving on the morning of November 21, he experienced chest pains. He called the front desk and asked for a doctor. The desk clerk said that "a house doctor would be right up." "A house doctor?" he replied jokingly, "No, dummy, I need a people doctor".

A doctor gave Baer medicine, and a fire department rescue squad administered oxygen. His chest pains subsided and he was showing signs of recovery when he was stricken with a second heart attack. Just a moment before, he was joking with the doctor, declaring he had come through two similar but lighter attacks earlier in Sacramento, California. Then he slumped on his left side, turned blue and died within a matter of minutes. His last words reportedly were, "Oh God, here I go."

Funeral
Baer's funeral in Sacramento was attended by more than 1,500 mourners. Four former world boxing champions appeared and Joe Louis and Jack Dempsey were among the pallbearers. The cemetery service was concluded by an American Legion honor guard recognizing Baer's service in World War II. Baer's obituary made the front page of The New York Times. He was laid to rest in a garden crypt in St. Mary's Catholic Cemetery in Sacramento.

Legacy
There is a park named for Baer in Livermore, California. There is also a park named for him in Sacramento. He was honored by the Bay Area Sports Hall of Fame in 1988.

Baer was an active member of the Fraternal Order of Eagles. When Max died of a heart attack in 1959, the Eagles created a charity fund as a tribute to his memory and as a means of combating the disease that killed him. The Max Baer Heart Fund is
primarily to aid in heart research and education. Since the fund started in 1959, millions of dollars have been donated to universities, medical centers and hospitals across the United States and Canada for heart research and education.

Selected filmography

 The Prizefighter and the Lady (1933, co-starring Myrna Loy) as Morgan
 Max Baer vs. Max Schmeling (1933) as Himself
 World's Heavyweight Championship: Primo Carnera and Max Baer (1934) as Himself
 Kids on the Cuff (1935)
 Joe Louis vs. Jack Sharkey (1936) as Himself
 Over She Goes (1938, a musical comedy) as Silas Morner
 Fisticuffs (1938, Short, a Pete Smith specialty short for MGM Studios) as Himself
 The Navy Comes Through (1942, starring Pat O'Brien) as Coxswain G. Berringer
 The McGuerins from Brooklyn (1942) as Professor Samson
 Ladies' Day (1943, a baseball comedy starring Lupe Vélez) as Hippo Jones
 Buckskin Frontier (1943, a 19th-century western saga with Richard Dix) as Tiny
 Africa Screams (1949, with his brother, Buddy, a comedy with Abbott and Costello) as Grappler McCoy
 Bride for Sale (1949) as Litka
 Riding High (1950) as Bertie (uncredited)
 Skipalong Rosenbloom (1951) as Butcher Baer
 Rocky Marciano vs. Archie Moore (1955) as Himself - Guest
 The Harder They Fall (1956, starring Humphrey Bogart) as Buddy Brannen
 Utah Blaine (1957, with Rory Calhoun in the title role) as Gus Ortmann
 Once Upon a Horse... (1958) as Ben (final film role)

Alluded to in:
 The Tortoise and the Hare (1934) Disney. In this cartoon short, a tortoise is pitted against a hare in a race. The first time the hare appears on screen, he is wearing a robe similar to a boxer's robe. On the back of the robe is emblazoned "Max Hare". This cartoon came out the year that Baer won his heavyweight title.

Portrayed in:
 Cinderella Man (2005) – portrayed by Craig Bierko
 Carnera: The Walking Mountain (2008) by Antonio Cupo

TV guest appearances
 Playhouse 90 (1957) (Screen Gems TV, CBS) ... Mike ... episode: Requiem for a Heavyweight
 Abbott and Costello Show (1953) ... Killer ... episode: Killer's Wife
 Make Room For Daddy  (1958) ... Himself ... episode: Rusty The Bully

Professional boxing record
All information in this section is derived from BoxRec, unless otherwise stated.

Official Record

All newspaper decisions are officially regarded as “no decision” bouts and are not counted in the win/loss/draw column.

Unofficial Record

Record with the inclusion of newspaper decisions in the win/loss/draw column.

See also

 List of heavyweight boxing champions
 List of select Jewish boxers

References

Other sources
 Los Angeles Times, March 30, 1934, pg. 12, Germany Bans Film of Baer
 Los Angeles Times Magazine, Mad Max, J.R. Moehringer (Times Staff Writer), January 7, 2007
 Sussman, Jeffrey. 2016. Max Baer and Barney Ross: Jewish Heroes of Boxing. Lanham, MD: Rowman & LIttlefield.

External links

 Max Baer - CBZ Profile
 Boxing Hall of Fame
 Site about Max Baer
 'The Forgotten Champion' by Aaron Richardson
 
 
 
 
 Watch Max Baer in Africa Screams
 Fraternal Order of Eagles Charity Foundation

1909 births
1959 deaths
Boxers from Nebraska
Heavyweight boxers
World Boxing Association champions
World heavyweight boxing champions
American male boxers
American male film actors
American people of Czech-Jewish descent
American people of German descent
International Boxing Hall of Fame inductees
Sportspeople from Omaha, Nebraska
International Jewish Sports Hall of Fame inductees
20th-century American male actors
Jewish American boxers
20th-century American Jews
Boxers from Sacramento, California